A destructive series of three tornadoes hit Mississippi, Kentucky, and Tennessee on January 23, 1969. This worst tornado was a violent F4 twister that devastated Hazlehurst, Mississippi and caused 32 fatalities.

Confirmed tornadoes

Hazlehurst, Mississippi

At 4:19 a.m. (CST), radar indicated a strong thunderstorm cell strengthening rapidly southeast of Jonesville, Louisiana in Concordia Parish. A tornado soon occurred in Jefferson County, Mississippi, south-southeast of Fayette, where some damage was reported. The tornado mainly traveled through sparsely populated areas, excluding the Hazlehurst area. Mainly trees were either debarked or uprooted, but structures in Hazlehurst sustained extensive damage. At another point, the tornado caused ground scouring and downed trees in all directions. Most of the structural damage occurred to outbuildings and farm buildings. The tornado was first noted near the Hazlehurst area at 5:45 a.m. (CST). A number of families in Hazlehurst lived on a hill near a lumber pond. The tornado dumped 18 people into the pond, of which all became missing. Afterwards, the pond was drained to try recovering the missing bodies. In Shady Grove, several buildings were destroyed. In Copiah County, 11 people were killed and 140 people were injured. The tornado caused $900,000 (1969 USD) in Copiah County. A family in Simpson County lied down on the floor and were not injured. A bus was parked in front of the home, and its body was blown away. South of Harrisville, a log house was reduced to rubble. Throughout the rest of the path (until the city of Puckett), 12 people were found dead. A family near Puckett were trying to escape the tornado, but their car wouldn't start. Instead, they jumped into a ditch and survived as their three-bedroom home was lifted off of its foundation. One of the family members was seriously injured by a falling limb. The tornado also lifted a tenant house into the air. A hog barn was also destroyed, which resulted in the fatalities of four hogs, of which 800 were in there. The tornado caused minor damage to trees before dissipating near Newton. Overall, 32 people were killed and 241 were injured.

See also
List of North American tornadoes and tornado outbreaks
Tornado outbreak sequence of Early-December 1953
1953 Vicksburg, Mississippi tornado
Tornado outbreak of March 3–4, 1966
February 1971 Mississippi Delta tornado outbreak

Notes

References

Hazlehurst, Mississippi tornadoes
Tornadoes in Mississippi
Tornadoes in Kentucky
Tornadoes in Tennessee
Hazlehurst, Mississippi tornadoes
Hazlehurst, Mississippi tornadoes